John Arthur Barry (1850 – 23 September 1911) was a journalist and author.

Barry was born in Torquay, Devonshire, England, in 1850. His parents died when he was young, and he went to sea at 13 after persuading his guardian and was in the merchant service for 12 years.

Leaving with a first mate's certificate, Barry came to Australia in the 1870s, and after working in Queensland at the gold diggings, spent some years as a drover, boundary rider and station manager. He returned to shipboard life around 1877 along the east coast of Australia for about two years. Then he returned to the land as an overseer and station manager. He began writing for the press and contributed stories to The Australasian, The Sydney Mail, The Queenslander, the Town and Country Journal, the Pall Mall Gazette, and others. In 1893 he spent a holiday in England and published a collection of his stories, Steve Brown's Bunyip and other Stories. He had become acquainted with Rudyard Kipling who wrote an introductory poem for the volume.

Barry returned to Australia after about six months in England and joined the staff of the Sydney Evening News, another collection of his stories was published, In the Great Deep: Tales of the Sea (1896). This was followed by two novels, The Luck of the Native Born (1898), and A Son of the Sea (1899). Three collections of short stories followed, Against the Tides of Fate (1899), Red Lion and Blue Star (1902), and Sea Yarns (1910). South Sea Shipmates, a sea story, was published posthumously in 1914. Barry died in Sydney on 23 September 1911 of chronic myocarditis.

Bibliography

Novels

 The Luck of the Native Born (1898)
 A Son of the Sea (1899)

Short story collections

 Steve Brown's Bunyip and Other Stories (1893)
 In the Great Deep: Tales of the Sea (1896)
 Against the Tides of Fate (1899)
 Red Lion and Blue Star (1902)
 Sea Yarns (1910)
 South Sea Shipmates (1913)

References
H. P. Heseltine, 'Barry, John Arthur (1850 - 1911)', Australian Dictionary of Biography, Volume 7, MUP, 1979, pp 192–193

External links
 
 
 

1850 births
1911 deaths
19th-century Australian novelists
Australian journalists
Australian male novelists
Australian male short story writers
English emigrants to Australia
Australian sailors
English sailors
British Merchant Navy officers
19th-century Australian short story writers
19th-century male writers
20th-century Australian short story writers
Australian stockmen